Scottia is a genus of ostracods in the family Cyprididae.

Species 
Extant species:
 Scottia audax
 Scottia birigida
 Scottia insularis
 Scottia pseudobrowniana

Fossil species:
 †Scottia bonei
 †Scottia browniana
 †Scottia candonaeformis
 †Scottia dacica
 †Scottia kempfi
 †Scottia tumida

References

External links 
 
 Scottia at lbm.go.jp

Cyprididae
Podocopida genera